Clifford Haudel "Cliff" Evans (14 July 1913 – July 1982) was a Welsh professional rugby league footballer who played in the 1930s and 1940s, and coached in the 1950s, 1960s and 1970s.

Background
Cliff Evans was born in Resolven, Glamorgan, and he died aged 69 in Wiltshire.

Playing career

International honours
Evans won 7 caps for Wales in 1936–1941 while at Leeds.

Les Diables Rouges
Evans was one of the players who successfully toured in France with Salford in 1934, during which the Salford team earned the name "Les Diables Rouges", the seventeen players were; Joe Bradbury, Bob Brown, Aubrey Casewell, Paddy Dalton, Bert Day, Cliff Evans, Jack Feetham, George Harris, Barney Hudson, Emlyn Jenkins, Alf Middleton, Sammy Miller, Harold Osbaldestin, Les Pearson, Gus Risman, Billy Watkins and Billy Williams.

Challenge Cup Final appearances
Evans played right-, i.e. number 3, in Leeds' 19-2 victory over Halifax in the 1940–41 Challenge Cup Final during the 1940–41 season at Odsal Stadium, Bradford, in front of a crowd of 28,500, and played , i.e. number 5, in the 15-10 victory over Halifax in the 1941–42 Challenge Cup Final during the 1941–42 season at Odsal Stadium, Bradford, in front of a crowd of 15,250.

County Cup Final appearances
About Evans's time, there was Salford's 2-15 defeat by Warrington in the 1929 Lancashire Cup Final during the 1929–30 season at Central Park, Wigan on Saturday 23 November 1929, the 10-8 victory over Swinton in the 1931 Lancashire Cup Final during the 1931–32 season at The Cliff, Broughton, Salford on Saturday 21 November 1931, the 21-12 victory over Wigan in the 1934 Lancashire Cup Final during the 1934–35 season at Station Road, Swinton on Saturday 20 October 1934, the 15-7 victory over Wigan in the 1935 Lancashire Cup Final during the 1935–36 season at Wilderspool Stadium, Warrington on Saturday 19 October 1935, and the 5-2 victory over Wigan in the 1936 Lancashire Cup Final during the 1936–37 season at Wilderspool Stadium, Warrington on Saturday 17 October 1936. Evans played  in Leeds' 14-8 victory over Huddersfield in the 1937–38 Yorkshire Cup Final during the 1937–38 season at Belle Vue, Wakefield on Saturday 30 October 1937.

Coaching career

Championship final appearances
Starting in 1954 Evans was the coach in Swinton's victory in the Championship during the 1962–63 season and 1963–64 season, and was the coach in St. Helens' 24–12 victory over Leeds in the Championship Final during the 1969–70 season at Odsal, Bradford on Saturday 16 May 1970.

Rugby league county leagues
Evans was the coach in St. Helens' victory in the Lancashire League during the 1968–69 season.

County Cup Final appearances
Evans was the coach in St. Helens' 13-10 victory over (following a 2-2 draw with) Warrington in the 1967 Lancashire Cup Final during the 1967–68 season at Station Road, Swinton on Saturday 2 December 1967, was the coach in the 30-2 victory over Oldham in the 1968 Lancashire Cup Final during the 1968–69 season at Central Park, Wigan on Friday 25 October 1968, and was the coach in Salford's 25–11 victory over Swinton in the 1972 Lancashire Cup Final during the 1972–73 season at Wilderspool Stadium, Warrington on Saturday 21 October 1972.

BBC2 Floodlit Trophy Final appearances
Evans was the coach in St. Helens' 4–7 defeat by Wigan in the 1968–69 BBC2 Floodlit Trophy Final at Central Park, Wigan on Tuesday 16 December 1968.

References

External links

1913 births
1982 deaths
Leeds Rhinos players
Rugby league centres
Rugby league five-eighths
Rugby league halfbacks
Rugby league players from Resolven
Salford Red Devils coaches
Salford Red Devils players
St Helens R.F.C. coaches
Swinton Lions coaches
Wales national rugby league team players
Welsh rugby league coaches
Welsh rugby league players